Crazy Day of Engineer Barkasov is a 1983 Soviet comedy feature film, directed by Nikolai Lyrchikov, loosely based on the play Canvas Bag and the stories of Mikhail Zoshchenko.   The film was produced by the Gorky Film Studio and commissioned by the Television in the Soviet Union.

Cast 
Vasily Bochkarev as Alexey Gavrilovic Barkasov
Natalya Sayko as Zoya Barkasova
 Yevgeniya Khanayeva as Alisa Yuryevna, Barkasov's mother-in-law 
 Valentina Telichkina as nanny
 Mikhail Kononov as Ivan Tyatin
 Olga Ostroumova as Sonya, secretary
 Igor Dmitriev as Yuri Krutetskiy
 Andrey Martynov as Slonyaev, poet
 Pyotr Shcherbakov as Abramotkin
 Valentina Talyzina as Kobylina
 Vyacheslav Nevinny as Kobylin
 Georgy Millyar as neighbor
 Alexander Lazarev as doctor
 Vladimir Grammatikov as radio center director
 Boris Novikov as stoker

References

External links 

1983 films
1983 comedy films
Soviet comedy films
Gorky Film Studio films
Films based on works by Mikhail Zoshchenko
1980s Russian-language films